A welcome is a kind of greeting designed to introduce a person to a new place or situation, and to make them feel at ease. The term can similarly be used to describe the feeling of being accepted on the part of the new person.

In some contexts, a welcome is extended to a stranger to an area or a household. "The concept of welcoming the stranger means intentionally building into the interaction those factors that make others feel that they belong, that they matter, and that you want to get to know them". It is also noted, however, that "[i]n many community settings, being welcoming is viewed as in conflict with ensuring safety. Thus, welcoming becomes somewhat self-limited: 'We will be welcoming unless you do something unsafe'". Different cultures have their own traditional forms of welcome, and a variety of different practices can go into an effort to welcome:

Indications that visitors are welcome can occur at different levels. For example, a welcome sign, at the national, state, or municipal level, is a road sign at the border of a region that introduces or welcomes visitors to the region. A welcome sign might also be present for a specific community, or an individual building. One architect suggests that "[a] primary distinction between a gateway and a Welcome sign is that the gateway is usually designed and built by an outsider, a developer or architect, while the Welcome sign has been designed and built by an inside member of the community". A welcome mat is a doormat that welcomes visitors to a house or other building by providing them with a place to wipe their feet before entering.

Another community tradition, the welcome wagon, a phrase that originally referred to an actual wagon containing a collection of useful gifts collected from residents of an area to welcome new people moving to that area.

See also

Gratitude
Hospitality
Thank you (phrase)
You're Welcome (disambiguation)

References

Human communication
Greetings